Bavaria Brewery, formally known as Bavaria S.A., is a Colombian brewery company founded on April 4, 1889, by Leo S. Kopp, a German immigrant. In 2005, Bavaria Brewery became a subsidiary of SABMiller. Before the merger, Bavaria was the second-largest brewery in South America.

On 10 October 2016, Anheuser-Busch InBev acquired the SABMiller company, so SABMiller ceased to exist as a corporation and ceased trading on global stock markets, and Bavaria became a division of the first.

History 
In 1876, Leo Siegfried and Emil Kopp arrived in Santander seeking business opportunities. In 1879, with the brothers Santiago and Carlos Arturo Castello, they formed in Bogota the company Kopp y Castello, for the trading and importing of goods.

On April 4, 1889, the acquisition of a lot for the construction of a brewery was registered in Bogota. In 1890, the society Kopp and Castello was dissolved and was created the company Bavaria Kopp's Deutsche Bierbrauerei, which on 22 April of the following year recorded as factory image the German imperial eagle, and opened its headquarters in San Diego, downtown Bogotá, on 28 May.

In December 1911, during the centenary of independence, they used the figure of Policarpa Salavarrieta in their La Pola brand.

Bottlers and brand names 
Bavaria's products are produced in six breweries located in different cities of Colombia, including Barranquilla, Bucaramanga, Tibasosa, Medellín, Tocancipá and Yumbo. It also has two malteries, one in Cartagena and another one in Tibitó via Zipaquirá-Briceño, two labeling factories, and one tapas factory.

The national beers produced by Bavaria are Poker, Aguila Original, Aguila Cero, Aguila Light, Aguila Fusion Limón, Club Colombia Dorada, Club Colombia Roja, Club Colombia Negra, Club Colombia Trigo, Club Colombia Oktoberfest, Club Colombia Siembra, Azteca, Redd's, Pilsen, Costeña, and Costeñita. The imports it distributes are Corona, Budweiser, and Stella Artois. Their non-alcoholic drinks are marketed as Zalva Water, Pony Malta, Pony Malta Mini, Pony Malta Vital, Malta Leona, and Cola & Pola.

Beers 
 Águila (pilsner, 4% alcohol by volume)
 Águila Light (pilsner, 3.5% alc. vol., light variant of the above)
 Brava (pilsner, 6.5% alc. vol.)
 Club Colombia (pilsner, 4.7% alc. vol.)
 Costeñita (pilsner, 4% alc. vol.)
 Costeña (pilsner, 4% alc. vol.)
 Leona (pilsner, 4% alc. vol.)
 Pilsen (pilsner, 4.2% alc. vol.)
 Póker (pilsner, 4% alc. vol.)

Other brands 

Agua Zalva
Malta Leona (high-energy drink)
 Pony Malta (energy malt beverage)
Cola & Pola (refajo)

Awards And recognition 

 Superior Taste Award. Club Colombia and Pony Malta received this international quality award. The Monde Selection Institute in Brussels, Belgium, which awards drinks with the highest quality in the world, recognised two of the main brands in Bavaria's portfolio: Club Colombia and Pony Malta. With these, Bavaria has received 28 awards through its brands.
 Superior Taste Award 2011. Two gold stars to Club Colombia Roja and three gold stars to Aguila and Club Colombia, awarded by the International Taste & Quality Institute of Brussels.
 Superior Taste Award 2012. 1 gold star to Aguila Light, with two gold stars to Club Colombia Roja and Club Colombia Negra; and with 3 gold stars to Club Colombia and Aguila, awarded by the International Taste & Quality Institute in Brussels.

Sustainability 
Bavaria has been working for over 130 years to transform Colombia.

Bavaria Entrepreneurs 
Bavaria created the Bavaria Entrepreneurs program to give tools to women shopkeepers to strengthen the main source of income for their home, their shop. It also provides financial and educational benefits to improve their quality of life and that of their families. These shopkeepers have become leaders and agents of change within their localities. The programme has benefited more than 11,300 women from about 50 municipalities in 20 departments.

Sowing Bavaria 
For more than 10 years, Bavaria, through the Bavaria Foundation, has invested more than $2 million in research to promote malt barley production in Colombia. Through this program, Bavaria works with farmers to continue to promote beer barley crops and the development of the Colombian countryside.

Bavarian Water Funds 
Bavaria works with 4 water funds in Colombia to develop strategies to identify the main water risks faced by each region and establish action plans to mitigate them.

MiPáramo 
Bavaria, through MiPáramo, protects the Forest “Alto Andino” in order to guarantee the quantity and quality of water coming from the Santurbán moor, through conservation with peasant families and isolation of the forest with fences. Through conservation, restoration, and sustainable agricultural practices, more than 3,700 hectares have been protected in this area of the country. This project has benefited 1,066 peasant families in the region, planted more than 179,000 trees, and worked with major national and international partners to positively impact this ecosystem.

Responsible consumption 
Bavaria is committed to promoting responsible consumption of alcohol in adults, and the prevention of underage alcohol consumption. To do this, the company works in partnership with local government entities, district schools, and value chain actors (such as shopkeepers) to prevent underage alcohol consumption. Bavaria also conducts annual communication campaigns to promote the responsible consumption of alcohol.

Global Beer Responsibility Day 
More than 3,000 employees took to the streets, bringing tips and smart consumer messages to consumers and shopkeepers who delivered them, thus raising awareness among more than 140,000 people.

Volunteer program 
Bavaria has the largest volunteer program in Colombia. #Meuno is a web platform that aims to connect volunteer organizations and networks throughout the nation. In 2019, Bavaria mobilized more than 12,000 volunteers to clean up the country's most important water sources in 15 cities, working with more than 150 partners and extracting 300 tons of garbage. The platform has over 56,000 registered volunteers and has been consolidated as an effective tool to support volunteer work in the country.

References

External links
  Bavaria Brewery Official Site

Beers 
  Águila Beer Official Site
  Club Colombia Beer Official Site

Other brands 
  Brisa Official Site

Beer in Colombia
Food and drink companies of Colombia
Companies based in Bogotá
Food and drink companies established in 1889
1889 establishments in Colombia
SABMiller
Colombian brands